Lercio is an Italian site of news satire providing humorous and grotesque articles, headlines, polls and other columns to satirize the tone and format of sensationalistic press, in the style of The Onion.

History 
The site, founded by Michele Incollu as a parody of the free press website Leggo (from which it takes the font of the logo and the sounding alike name), published its first article on October 28, 2012.

Lercio is edited by a satirical group that started writing punchlines on La Palestra, a school of comedy writing in the website of the Italian popular comedian Daniele Luttazzi, then founded Acido Lattico and finally joined the editorial staff of Lercio.

On September 13, 2014 Lercio revealed itself to the general public by winning best Italian website and best joke categories at Macchianera Internet Awards.

In November 2014 Lercio released its first book “Un anno Lercio”, published by Rizzoli and with a fake preface by Orson Welles.

In 2015 the renowned Accademia della Crusca in Florence, targeted by the collective in numerous articles, dedicated to Lercio one of its famous shovels.

On April 13, 2017, Lercio released its second book “Lo sporco che fa notizia”, published by Shockdom with a preface by Daniele Luttazzi and a cartoons introduction by Sio.

In August 2017 Lercio performed two shows at the 25th edition of the Sziget Festival in Budapest.

Since 2018 Lercio has been collaborating with famous satirical sites from all over Europe, such as Der Postillon (Germany), Le Gorafi (France) and El Mundo Today (Spain), exchanging and translating articles.

In November 2018 two authors from the collective went to Ethiopia for a reportage to promoting a development project under the aegis of the international NGO AMREF.

On December 6, 2018, with a preface by Giobbe Covatta and cover and internal drawings by Sara Pichelli, Lercio released its third book “La storia lercia del mondo”, again by Shockdom, composed almost exclusively of unpublished pieces.

From January 28, 2019, “Best of Lercio”, a selection of the best articles published in the past year, is available in the Audible library.

In June 2020, Lercio.it occupies 7th position in the ranking of Italian media interactions on social network sites.

In July 2020, the website of the Enciclopedia Italiana di Scienze, Lettere ed Arti (Treccani) publishes an analysis about Lercio metalinguistic satire.

On July 28, 2020, Lercio released its first quiz book “Vero o Lercio? Lo sporco che non ti aspetti”, published by Rizzoli.

The editorial staff of Lercio is often requested in institutes and universities, (e.g. CNR) to talk about the relationships between satire and fake news, and has taken part in important festivals throughout Italy, including the Cortona Mix Festival, Parole O_Stili, Prix Italia, Parole in Cammino - The Italian language festival, Futura Festival, Web Marketing Festival, Social Media Strategies, Perugia International Journalism Festival, Pisa Internet Festival and Lucca Comics & Games.

Television 
From 2017 to 2018 "TG Lercio" news videos were broadcast on television by DMAX.

On November 21, 2019, TG Lercio makes its debut on RAI television channel in TV show “Gli Stati Generali", hosted by Serena Dandini on Rai Tre national network.

Awards 

 2014

 Macchianera Italian Awards (categories: best website and joke)

 2015

 Macchianera Italian Awards (categories: best website, satire and humor website and best joke)
 Forte dei Marmi Political Satire Award (category: Web)

 2016

 Carnival of Viareggio Satire Award
 Macchianera Italian Awards (categories: best website, satire and humor website and best joke)

 2017

 Web Marketing Festival (category: Digital Journalism)
 Macchianera Italian Awards (categories: best website, satire and humor website and best joke)

2018

 Macchianera Italian Awards (categories: best satire and humor website and best joke)

2019

 "Massimo Troisi" Award for best comical writing
 "Gabriele Galantara" Satire & Caricature International Award
 Macchianera Italian Awards (categories: best website, satire and humor website and joke)
 Biennale dell'Umorismo di Tolentino (Accademia Social Award)
2020

 Bagheria ComBag Award 2020 for the comunication

 2021

 Magna Grecia Awards

 2022

 Premio Gianfranco Funari - Il giornalaio dell'anno della Fondazione Carnevale di Viareggio

Bibliography 

 Un anno Lercio: il 2014 come non l'avete mai letto (2014), Rizzoli (ed.), 
 Lercio. Lo sporco che fa notizia. Il libro (2017), Shockdom (ed.), 
 Lercio. La storia lercia del mondo. I retroscena dell'umanità (2018), Shockdom (ed.), 
 Vero o Lercio? Lo sporco che non ti aspetti  (2020), Bur Rizzoli (ed.), 
 Mock'n'Troll (2021), People (ed.), 
 Lercio. Cerco amico scemo a cui regalare questo libro. Il peggior libro da colorare mai esistito (2021), Fabbri (ed.),

See also 

 News satire
 List of satirical news websites

References 

Satirical websites
Italian websites